Michelle L. Downey Caldier (born 1976) is an American dentist, professor, and politician serving as a member of the Washington House of Representatives, representing the 26th district since 2015. A member of the Republican Party, Caldier was elected to the Washington House of Representatives in 2014, defeating incumbent Democrat Larry Seaquist by a narrow vote margin with her election giving Washington Republicans one of four pickups in the House in the 2014 election. Her district includes the cities of Bremerton, Gig Harbor and Port Orchard.

Early life, education, and early career
Caldier was born in Bremerton, Washington, and raised in Kitsap County. Caldier graduated from Central Kitsap High School. Caldier earned her Associate of Sciences at Olympic College, and went on to earn her Bachelor of Science from the University of Washington, followed by her Doctorate in Dental Surgery from the University of Washington School of Dentistry.

Caldier has owned a dentistry practice for more than a decade that serves nursing homes around Puget Sound. She was also an Affiliate Professor at the University of Washington School of Dentistry.

In 2012, Caldier joined others to lobby the Legislature to restore funding to adult dental care for those on Medicaid, and was successful. This inspired her to run for the Legislature and continue fighting for those who cannot care for themselves. Caldier has donated thousands of hours to caring for the underserved, and chaired the Access to Care Committee for several years.

Washington legislature

Elections 
In 2014, Caldier decided to challenge incumbent Democratic State Representative Larry Seaquist of Washington's 26th house district, seat 2. She defeated him 50.61% – 49.37%, a difference of 601 votes. Caldier became the first Republican elected to the seat since then Rep. Lois McMahan was defeated by Derek Kilmer in 2004.

Results

Tenure 

Caldier was the author and prime sponsor of House Bill 1855, a measure that requires local school districts to waive local requirements for foster children, homeless children, and at-risk youth who have attended three or more high schools and have met all state requirements for graduation. This is similar to current exceptions allowed for military dependent of active service members. The Washington State House of Representatives unanimously passed the bill on March 2, 2015.

Committee assignments
Appropriations
Education
Health Care & Wellness

Personal life
Caldier resides in Port Orchard, Washington. She has been an outspoken advocate for foster children, having herself been a foster child. She is the mother and foster mother of three daughters.

References

External links
 Representative Michelle Caldier

Living people
People from Bremerton, Washington
American dentists
Republican Party members of the Washington House of Representatives
Women state legislators in Washington (state)
21st-century American politicians
21st-century American women politicians
1976 births